Thomas Arthur Darvill (born 17 June 1982) is an English actor. He is known for portraying Rory Williams, a companion of the Eleventh Doctor in the television series Doctor Who (2010–2012), as well as Rip Hunter in Legends of Tomorrow (2016–2018 & 2021) and Rev. Paul Coates in Broadchurch (2013–2017). From 2013 to 2014, he appeared in the lead role in the theatre musical Once in the West End and on Broadway.

Early life 
Thomas Arthur Darvill was born in Birmingham on 17 June 1982. His mother, Ellie, is an actress; during his early childhood, she worked with masks, puppets, and live acting as a member of Cannon Hill Theatre at the Midlands Arts Centre, and toured the world. She is also known as the puppeteer and voice behind Why Bird from Playdays. His father, Nigel, played the Hammond organ for artists including Edwin Starr, Ruby Turner, Fine Young Cannibals, and UB40. Darvill attended Bromsgrove School in Worcestershire from 1993 to 2000.

Career

Early work 
Darvill joined Stage2 Youth Theatre Company at the age of 10. He was a member from 1991 to 2000, and had an early job on CITV in 2000, presenting the continuity links between the shows; during this time he was billed as Tom Darvill. He left in 2001, founded his own theatre company (called Fuego's Men), and performed in the Midlands. At the age of 21, Darvill moved to London with four friends from youth theatre, each having secured a place at a drama school. They moved into a house in White City together. Darvill trained in acting at the Royal Academy of Dramatic Art,  and is trained in stage combat.

Darvill made his professional stage debut playing condemned criminal Harrison in Edmund White's Terre Haute, which ran at the Assembly Rooms during the Edinburgh Festival Fringe. His performance was praised by Nicholas de Jongh of the Evening Standard and Susannah Clapp of The Observer. Darvill appeared in Terre Hautes transfer to Trafalgar Studios in 2007. His performance gained him a Best Newcomer nomination at the 2007 Evening Standard Theatre Awards.

Darvill played Rob in the 2007 monologue Stacy, in a performance The Times described as "compelling". Later that year, he appeared in the Vaudeville Theatre's production of Swimming with Sharks with Christian Slater, Helen Baxendale and Matt Smith (which gained him a London Newcomer Award nomination).

Television, film and theatre 

In 2008, Darvill made his television acting debut in the ITV crime drama He Kills Coppers. The same year, he played Edward "Tip" Dorrit in the BBC serial Little Dorrit. Darvill began playing Rory Williams, companion to the Eleventh Doctor, in the fifth series of the BBC's science fiction show Doctor Who (reuniting with his Swimming with Sharks co-star Matt Smith). He became a regular character in the sixth series, and confirmed that he would be appearing in the seventh series; before he and his co-star Karen Gillan (on-screen wife Amy Pond) left in the fifth episode.

Darvill had a minor role as a stable groom in Ridley Scott's Robin Hood, and played Mick Gallagher in Sex & Drugs & Rock & Roll (both 2010). In the summer of 2011, he played Mephistopheles "an agent of the Devil in human form" in Doctor Faustus at Shakespeare's Globe Theatre in London, a production which was subsequently issued as a DVD. After his departure from Doctor Who he was cast in the drama Broadchurch as vicar Paul Coates, alongside David Tennant and Olivia Colman.

On 19 April 2013, he took over the lead male role of Guy from the musical Once, on Broadway, New York, opposite new co-star Joanna Christie. The two performers also made an appearance on the 2013 Tony Awards to perform a number and to present the award for best scenery. Darvill continued the role in the West End production from 17 March 2014 until 10 May 2014.

In March 2015, Darvill was cast as the time-traveller Rip Hunter in the series Legends of Tomorrow. He was written out of the show in 2018, by the end of the third season. However, he returned in 2021 for the show's one hundredth episode. In 2019, Darvill took on the role of Oscar Lindquist in the West End revival of Sweet Charity.

In 2022, Darvill played the lead male role of Curly McLain in the musical Oklahoma! at the Young Vic. In 2023, he continued the role in the West End production.

Music and audio work 
Darvill is also a musician and a composer; he has written songs and music for the Bush Theatre, and composed the score for Che Walker's 2008 play The Frontline at Shakespeare's Globe. In June 2009, the musical Been So Long, based on Ché Walker's 1998 play, opened at the Young Vic and in September 2013 another collaboration, The Lightning Child, opened at the Globe. Darvill had worked with Walker for a number of years since they had first met at RADA, developing the songs and music for the show. The musical was performed at the Latitude Festival in July and had a run at the Traverse Theatre in August. Darvill received a Judge's Discretionary Award from MTM for his music. In 2010, Darvill helped promote the solo album of Fyfe Dangerfield, playing with him on sessions for Graham Norton's show and on Xfm.

Darvill has undertaken a number of radio and voice projects, including Doctor Who audiobooks. In December 2011, he played Keith Moon for BBC Radio 4's Burning Both Ends. In 2012, he voiced Gulliver in Radio 4's Gulliver's Travels and Sam in the short film Penguin.

He collaborated with playwright Sam Holcroft on a musical adaptation of Roald Dahl's Fantastic Mr. Fox which premiered at the Nuffield Theatre, Southampton, in November 2016.

In 2018, Darvill started the new musical collective Paperlands with Ines De Clercq. The collective performed at St Pancras Old Church on 22 November 2018. They took some time to record in a studio in December of that year.

In 2020, Darvill appeared on the concept album for Vikki Stone and Katie Mulgrew's musical #ZoologicalSociety.
Despite the concert being cancelled due to the COVID-19 pandemic, the album featuring Darvill was released digitally on 27 March 2020.

On 13 June 2020 it was confirmed that Darvill would reprise his role as Rory Williams with Big Finish Productions, in a multi-boxset series entitled The Lone Centurion, chronicling the character's time between the episodes "The Pandorica Opens" and "The Big Bang".

Personal life 
Darvill plays the guitar and keyboards, and formed an indie band called Edmund in his teenage years; it was named after Edmund Pevensie, his favourite character in The Lion, the Witch and the Wardrobe. He enjoys cooking and attending the theatre and concerts. He also collects taxidermy. He is close friends with his Doctor Who former co-stars Karen Gillan and Matt Smith.

Alongside other British celebrities, Darvill designed and signed his own card for the UK-based charity Thomas Coram Foundation for Children. The cards were auctioned off on eBay during May 2014.

Filmography

Film

Television

Theatre

Video games

Audio

Radio

References

External links 

 
 Arthur Darvill RADA profile – includes list of plays while in training
 
 

1982 births
Living people
20th-century English male actors
21st-century English male actors
Alumni of RADA
English male composers
English male film actors
English male stage actors
English male television actors
English television presenters
Male actors from Birmingham, West Midlands
People educated at Bromsgrove School